Kim Hyung-Keun (born 6 January 1994) is a South Korean footballer who plays as a goalkeeper for Jeju United FC.

Career
Kim joined Busan IPark on 30 December 2015. He made his debut for the club in an FA Cup victory over Gyeongnam on 27 April 2016. His first league start came in a 1-1 draw with Bucheon on 21 May.

Club career statistics
As of 6 March 2023

References

External links 
 

1994 births
Living people
Association football goalkeepers
South Korean Buddhists
South Korean footballers
K League 2 players
K League 1 players
Busan IPark players
Seoul E-Land FC players
Jeju United FC players